Marshall Chalk (born 13 March 1981) is an Australian former professional rugby league footballer who played in the 2000s.  Chalk played for Canberra and Crusaders in the Super League.

Background
Chalk was born in Boonah, Queensland, Australia.

Playing career
Chalk made his first grade debut on 22 August 2004 against the Sydney City Roosters.  In his 2nd first grade game, Chalk scored 4 tries as Canberra defeated South Sydney 62-22.  

Chalk played a total of 71 games for Canberra and his last game for the club was a 36-10 loss against Cronulla in the 2008 qualifying final.

In 2009, he joined newly promoted Super League Welsh side Crusaders, where he played 14 games, scoring 4 tries; before returning to his native Australia for the 2010 season signed with the Gold Coast but did not make any first grade appearances for the club.

References

External links
Canberra Raiders profile

1981 births
Australian rugby league players
Canberra Raiders players
Crusaders Rugby League players
Rugby league centres
Rugby league second-rows
Rugby league wingers
Rugby league fullbacks
Living people
Rugby league players from Queensland